Psevdas Community Stadium is a football stadium which located at Psevdas village in Larnaca district. It is currently used mostly for football matches and is the home ground of Omonia Psevda.

Buildings and structures in Cyprus